The Jebel Ali Mile, is a horse race for horses aged four and over, run at a distance of 1,600 metres (one mile) on dirt in January at Jebel Ali Racecourse in Dubai.

The Jebel Ali Mile was first contested in 2010 as a Listed race before being elevated to Group 3 class in 2013.

Records
Record time:
 1:36.21 - Forjatt 2017

Most successful horse:
 2 - Treble Jig 2012, 2013
 2 - Forjatt 2014, 2017

Most wins by a jockey:
 2 - Wayne Smith 2012, 2013

Most wins by a trainer:
 4 - Mussabeh Al Mheiri 2011, 2012, 2013, 2015

Most wins by an owner:
 3 - Fathi Esaed Mohammed Egziama 2012, 2013, 2015

Winners

See also
 List of United Arab Emirates horse races

References

Horse races in the United Arab Emirates
Recurring sporting events established in 2010
2010 establishments in the United Arab Emirates